The 2021 Zagreb Ladies Open was a professional women's tennis tournament played on outdoor clay courts. It was the tenth edition of the tournament which was part of the 2021 ITF Women's World Tennis Tour. It took place in Zagreb, Croatia between 26 April and 2 May 2021.

Singles main-draw entrants

Seeds

 1 Rankings are as of 19 April 2021.

Other entrants
The following players received wildcards into the singles main draw:
  Lea Bošković
  Mihaela Đaković
  Jana Fett
  Petra Marčinko

The following players received entry using protected rankings:
  Alexandra Dulgheru
  Irina Khromacheva

The following player received entry using a junior exempt:
  Diane Parry

The following players received entry from the qualifying draw:
  Dalila Jakupović
  Réka Luca Jani
  Rebecca Marino
  Tereza Mrdeža
  Jule Niemeier
  Jessica Pieri
  Andreea Prisăcariu
  Tara Würth

The following players received entry as a lucky losers:
  Federica Arcidiacono
  Marie Benoît

Champions

Singles

 Anhelina Kalinina def.  Kamilla Rakhimova, 6–1, 6–3

Doubles

 Barbara Haas /  Katarzyna Kawa def.  Andreea Prisăcariu /  Nika Radišić, 7–6(7–1), 5–7, [10–6]

References

External links
 2021 Zagreb Ladies Open at ITFtennis.com
 Official website

2021 ITF Women's World Tennis Tour
2021 in Croatian tennis
April 2021 sports events in Croatia
May 2021 sports events in Croatia
Zagreb Ladies Open